The 2018–19 Cupa României was the 81st season of the annual Romanian primary football knockout tournament. As winners, Viitorul Constanța, qualified for the second qualifying round of the 2019–20 UEFA Europa League.

Times up to 27 October 2018 and from 31 March 2019 were EEST (UTC+3). Times from 28 October 2018 to 30 March 2019 were EET (UTC+2).

Participating clubs
The following 133 teams qualified for the competition:

Preliminary rounds

The first rounds, and any preliminaries, are organised by the Regional Leagues.

First round
All matches were played on 1 and 2 August 2018.

|colspan="3" style="background-color:#97DEFF"|1 August 2018

|-
|colspan="3" style="background-color:#97DEFF"|2 August 2018

|}

Second round
All matches were played on 14, 15 and 16 August 2018.

|colspan="3" style="background-color:#97DEFF"|14 August 2018

|-
|colspan="3" style="background-color:#97DEFF"|15 August 2018

|-
|colspan="3" style="background-color:#97DEFF"|16 August 2018

|}

Third round
All matches were played on 28 and 29 August 2018.

|colspan="3" style="background-color:#97DEFF"|28 August 2018

|-
|colspan="3" style="background-color:#97DEFF"|29 August 2018

 

|}

Fourth round
The matches were played between 11 and 13 September 2018. The game between Flacăra Moreni and Chindia Târgoviște was played on the 18th because it clashed with a rescheduled league match of Chindia.

|colspan="3" style="background-color:#97DEFF"|11 September 2018

|-
|colspan="3" style="background-color:#97DEFF"|12 September 2018

|-
|colspan="3" style="background-color:#97DEFF"|13 September 2018

|-
|colspan="3" style="background-color:#97DEFF"|18 September 2018

|}

Round of 32
The matches were played on 25, 26 and 27 September 2018.

Round of 16
The matches were played on 30, 31 October and 1 November 2018.

Quarter-finals
The matches were played on 26, 27 and 28 February 2019.

Semi-finals
The semi-final matches are played in a round-trip system. The first legs were played on 3 and 4 April 2019 and the second legs were played on 24 and 25 April 2019.

|}

1st leg

2nd leg

Final

References

 
Romania
Cupa României seasons